Silvano Babici (born 5 December 1952) is a former Italian male long-distance runner who competed at one edition of the IAAF World Cross Country Championships at senior level (1980).

Biography
His son Alessandro, who was a duathlon junior Italian national, died tragically while he was training at the age of 23.

References

External links
 Toscani Azzurri di sempre  

1952 births
Living people
Italian male long-distance runners